Frigidopyrenia is a fungal genus in the family Xanthopyreniaceae. It is a monotypic genus, containing the single species Frigidopyrenia bryospila, a subarctic crustose lichen. This lichen was originally described by Finnish lichenologist William Nylander in 1864 as Verrucaria bryospila. It was shuffled to several genera in its taxonomic history before Martin Grube circumscribed Frigidopyrenia in 2005 to contain it. As of 2017, no molecular sequence data was available for Frigidopyrenia.

References

Xanthopyreniaceae
Monotypic Dothideomycetes genera
Taxa described in 2005
Lichen genera